Parco Agricolo Sud Milano ("Rural Park South Milan") is a large protected rural area located south and south-east of Milan, Italy. The park was established in 1990 with the purpose of preserving, safeguarding, and enhancing the natural and historical heritage of the Po Valley. It is 47,000 hectares wide and shaped like a half-circle, located between Milan and the southern border of its Province. It also connects two other large protected natural areas: Ticino Park to the west and Adda Park to the east.

The park comprises different areas such as agricultural land proper, peripheral boroughs of Milan, a number of communes and cities of the Province of Milan, river basins (the two prominent rivers in the park being the Lambro and the Ticino), sparse woodlands, cascine (farms), local city parks (including Parco delle Cave, Boscoincittà, and Trenno Park), as well as historical monuments (like the Chiaravalle Abbey).

The park is directly managed by the Province of Milan.

Municipalities
The territories of the following municipalities are completely or partially included in Parco Agricolo Sud Milano:

Albairate
Arluno
Assago
Bareggio
Basiglio
Binasco
Bubbiano
Buccinasco
Calvignasco
Carpiano
Casarile
Cassina de' Pecchi
Cernusco sul Naviglio
Cerro al Lambro
Cesano Boscone
Cisliano
Colturano
Corbetta
Cornaredo
Corsico
Cusago
Dresano
Gaggiano
Gorgonzola
Gudo Visconti
Lacchiarella
Liscate
Locate di Triulzi
Mediglia
Melegnano
Melzo
Milan
Noviglio
Opera
Pantigliate
Paullo
Pero
Peschiera Borromeo
Pieve Emanuele
Pioltello
Pregnana Milanese
Rho
Rodano
Rosate
Rozzano
San Donato Milanese
San Giuliano Milanese
Sedriano
Segrate
Settala
Settimo Milanese
Trezzano sul Naviglio
Tribiano
Vanzago
Vermezzo
Vernate
Vignate
Vittuone
Vizzolo Predabissi
Zelo Surrigone
Zibido San Giacomo

References

External links

Parks in Milan